This is a list of sieges, land and naval battles of the War of the Third Coalition (18 May 1803 / 25 September 1805 – 26 December 1805 / 18 July 1806, depending on periodisation). It includes:
 the Trafalgar campaign (March–November 1805);
 the Ulm campaign (25 September – 20 October 1805);
 the Venetian campaign in modern-day Veneto (October–November 1805);
 the Austerlitz campaign in modern-day Austria and Czechia (30 October – 2 December 1805); 
 the Hanover Expedition or Weser Expedition (19 November 1805 – 15 February 1806);
 the Invasion of Naples (1806) (8 February – 18 July 1806), with the Battle of Mileto (28 May 1807) as a last reprise.
 It also includes the British conquest of the Dutch Cape Colony (in modern-day South Africa) and Dutch Surinam from the French-aligned Batavian Republic, and some naval engagements between British and French(-Spanish/-Batavian) forces in the Caribbean and the English Channel.

See also 
 Anglo-Russian occupation of Naples (summer 1805 – January 1806)
 List of battles of the War of the First Coalition
 List of battles of the War of the Second Coalition
 List of battles of the War of the Fourth Coalition
 List of battles of the War of the Fifth Coalition
 List of battles of the War of the Sixth Coalition
 List of battles of the Hundred Days (War of the Seventh Coalition)
 Napoleon's planned invasion of the United Kingdom (planned from 1803 to 1805, but never carried out)

Notes

References 

Third Coalition